Bob Morane is a series of platform adventure video games, created by Infogrames Entertainment in 1987 based on the adventure book character of the same name.

List of video games 

Bob Morane: Chevalerie 1 (1987)
Bob Morane: Science Fiction 1 (1987)
Bob Morane: Jungle 1 (1987)
Bob Morane: Oceans 1 (1988)

References

Video game franchises introduced in 1987
Video game franchises
Video games based on novels
Video games based on comics
Infogrames games
Bob Morane